Ferdinand Hodler (March 14, 1853 – May 19, 1918) was one of the best-known Swiss painters of the nineteenth century. His early works were portraits, landscapes, and genre paintings in a realistic style. Later, he adopted a personal form of symbolism which he called "parallelism".

Early life
Hodler was born in Bern, the eldest of six children. His father, Jean Hodler, made a meager living as a carpenter; his mother, Marguerite (née Neukomm), was from a peasant family. By the time Hodler was eight years old, he had lost his father and two younger brothers to tuberculosis. His mother remarried, to a decorative painter named Gottlieb Schüpach who had five children from a previous marriage. The birth of additional children brought the size of Hodler's family to thirteen.

The family's finances were poor, and the nine-year-old Hodler was put to work assisting his stepfather in painting signs and other commercial projects. After the death of his mother from tuberculosis in 1867, Hodler was sent to Thun to apprentice with a local painter, Ferdinand Sommer. From Sommer, Hodler learned the craft of painting conventional Alpine landscapes, typically copied from prints, which he sold in shops and to tourists.

Career
In 1871, at the age of 18, Hodler travelled on foot to Geneva to start his career as a painter. He attended science lectures at the Collège de Genève, and in the museum there he copied paintings by Alexandre Calame.  In 1873 he became a student of Barthélemy Menn, and investigated Dürer’s writings on proportions.

He made a trip to Basel in 1875, where he studied the paintings of Hans Holbein—especially Dead Christ in the Tomb, which influenced Hodler's many treatments of the theme of death. He travelled to Madrid in 1878, where he stayed for several months and studied the works of masters such as Titian, Poussin, and Velázquez in the Museo del Prado.

In 1880–81, Hodler painted Self-Portrait (The Angry One), in which his expression displayed exasperation at his continued poverty and lack of recognition. It was ridiculed when displayed in Geneva, prompting Hodler's remark to a friend that the Swiss "will not understand me until they see I have been understood elsewhere". He submitted the painting to the Paris Salon, where it was his first work accepted, although it was ignored by the critics.

The works of Hodler's early maturity consisted of landscapes, figure compositions, and portraits, treated with a vigorous realism. In 1884, Hodler met Augustine Dupin (1852–1909), who became his companion and model for the next several years. Their son, Hector Hodler—who would found the World Esperanto Association in 1908—was born in 1887.

Hodler was married twice. From 1889 until their divorce in 1891, Hodler was married to Bertha Stucki, who is depicted in his painting, Poetry (1897, Museum für Gestaltung, Zürich). In 1898, Hodler married Berthe Jacques (1868–1957), whom he had met in 1894.

Parallelism

In the last decade of the nineteenth century his work evolved to combine influences from several genres including symbolism and art nouveau. In 1890 he completed Night, a work that marked Hodler's turn toward symbolist imagery. It depicts several recumbent figures, all of them relaxed in sleep except for an agitated man who is menaced by a figure shrouded in black, which Hodler intended as a symbol of death. When Hodler submitted the painting to the Beaux-Arts exhibition in Geneva in February 1891, the entwined nude figures created a scandal; the mayor deemed the work obscene, and it was withdrawn from the show. A few months later, Hodler exhibited Night in Paris at the Salon, where it attracted favorable attention and was championed by Puvis de Chavannes and Rodin.

Hodler developed a style he called "parallelism" that emphasized the symmetry and rhythm he believed formed the basis of human society. In paintings such as The Chosen One (1893), groupings of figures are symmetrically arranged in poses suggestive of ritual or dance. Hodler conceived of woman as the embodiment of the desire for harmony with nature, while a child or youth represented innocence and vitality. In Eurythmy (1895), the theme of death is represented by a row of five men in ceremonial robes walking in an ordered procession on a path strewn with fallen leaves.

Hodler painted number of large-scale historical paintings, often with patriotic themes.  In 1897 he accepted a commission to paint a series of large frescoes for the Weapons Room of the Schweizerisches Landesmuseum in Zurich.  The compositions he proposed, including The Battle of Marignan which depicted a battle that the Swiss lost, were controversial for their imagery and style, and Hodler was not permitted to execute the frescoes until 1900.In 1900 Hodler exhibited three major works—Night, Eurythmy, and Day (1900)—at the Exposition Universelle in Paris, where they won awards. He was invited to join both the Berlin Secession and the Vienna Secession groups. In 1904 he showed 31 works in Vienna, which brought him enhanced recognition and a sales success that finally eased his poverty. Hodler's work after 1900 took on an expressionist aspect with strongly coloured and geometrical figures. Landscapes were pared down to essentials, sometimes consisting of a jagged wedge of land between water and sky. The art historian Sepp Kern says that in Lake Geneva (c. 1911), "the bands formed by the shoreline, the mountains and their reflection on the surface of the water, together with the three-part rhythmic frieze of clouds, have been composed to form a cosmological whole."

In November 1900 Federal Councilor Zemp, the president of the postal and railway department, launched a design competition for a new Swiss postage stamp. Hodler anonymously sent a design showing a Freiburg herder, which was used 35 years later in the Swiss Pro Patria-Block of 1936.
 

In 1908, Hodler met Valentine Godé-Darel, who became his mistress, although he continued to live with his second wife. In 1913, Godé-Darel was diagnosed with a gynecological cancer, and the many hours Hodler spent by her bedside resulted in a remarkable series of paintings documenting her decline from the disease. In January 1914, three months after the birth of their daughter, Pauline, Godé-Darel was subjected to an operation for the cancer. In June 1914, she underwent a second operation. Her death in January 1915 affected Hodler greatly. He occupied himself with work on a series of about 20 introspective self-portraits that date from 1916.

In 1914 he condemned the German atrocities conducted using artillery at Rheims. In retaliation for this, German art museums excluded Hodler's work.

By 1917 his health was deteriorating. In November of that year he became ill with pulmonary edema, and told his son he was considering suicide. Although mostly bedridden, he painted a number of views of Geneva from his balcony in the months before his death on May 19, 1918.

Legacy

In his time, Hodler's mural-sized paintings of patriotic themes were especially admired. According to Sepp Kern, Hodler "helped revitalize the art of monumental wall painting, and his work is regarded as embodying the Swiss federal identity."

Many of Hodler's best-known paintings are scenes in which characters are engaged in everyday activities, such as the famous woodcutter (Der Holzfäller, 1910, Musée d'Orsay, Paris). In 1908, the Swiss National Bank commissioned Hodler to create two designs for new paper currency. His designs were controversial: rather than portraits of famous men, Hodler chose to depict a woodcutter (for the 50 Swiss franc bank note) and a reaper (for the 100 Franc note). Both appeared in the 1911 Series Two of the notes.

Much of Hodler's work is in public collections in Switzerland. Other collections holding major works include the Musée d'Orsay in Paris, the Metropolitan Museum of Art in New York, and the Art Institute of Chicago.

Controversies concerning Nazi looting and restitution claims 
Many of Hodler's collectors were German Jews who were persecuted under the Nazis from 1933 to 1945. As a result, concern has been expressed when artworks by Hodler turned up after WWII with gaps in the ownership history. When a painting ‘Lied aus der Ferne’ that Polish-born German-Jewish industrialist and art collector Max Meirowsky was forced to sell in 1938 turned up in the collection of Swiss politician Christoph Blocher, it set off a debate about Nazi looted art in Switzerland.

Hodler's "Thunersee with Stockhornkette", which is at the Simon and Charlotte Frick Foundation, has been claimed by the family of the Jewish art collector Max Silberberg, who was murdered in Auschwitz.

According to Christie's, Hodler's "Thunersee mit Niesen" was spoliated as a result of Nazi persecution from Ernst Flersheim, Frankfurt am Main, and sold by Galerie Nathan, Zurich to a private collector before being returned to the Flersheim family

The German Lost Art Foundation lists 37 works by Hodler.

Gallery

Notes

References
Fehlmann, Marc. Review of Oskar Bätschmann and Paul Müller eds., Ferdinand Hodler. Catalogue Raisonné der Gemälde, Die Landschaften, Zurich 2008: http://www.19thc-artworldwide.org/index.php/autumn09/ferdinand-hodler-catalogue-raisonne
Fischer, Matthias (2009). Der junge Hodler. Eine Künstlerkarriere 1872-1897, Wädenswil: Nimbus. .
Hauptman, William, & Hodler, Ferdinand (2007). Hodler. Milan: 5 continents. .
Hodler, Ferdinand, Franz Zelger, Lukas Gloor, Schweizerisches Institut für Kunstwissenschaft., & Seedamm Kulturzentrum. (1981). Der frühe Hodler: Das Werk 1870-1890. Bern: Benteli. .
 Hodler, Ferdinand (1983). Ferdinand Hodler, 1853-1918: Paris, Musée du Petit Palais, 11 mai-24 juillet 1983 : Berlin, 2 mars-24 avril 1983 : Zürich, 19 août-23 octobre 1983. Paris: Association française d'action artistique. .
 Hodler, Ferdinand, Jill Lloyd, Ulf Küster, and Oskar Bätschmann (2012). Ferdinand Hodler: view to infinity. Ostfildern: Hatje Cantz.  .
Kern, Sepp. "Hodler, Ferdinand". Grove Art Online. Oxford Art Online. Oxford University Press. Web.
 Ferdinand Hodler. Catalogue raisonné der Gemälde. Landschaften. Band 1. Hrsg. vom Schweizerischen Institut für Kunstwissenschaft Zürich. Scheidegger & Spiess, Zürich 2008, . (Band 1 enthält Teilband 1 [Kat. 1–300] und Teilband 2 [Kat. 301–626, D1–D52 (fragliche Zuschreibungen), R1–R70 (irrtümliche und falsche Zuschreibungen).]
 Ferdinand Hodler. Catalogue raisonné der Gemälde. Bildnisse. Band 2. Hrsg. vom Schweizerischen Institut für Kunstwissenschaft Zürich. Scheidegger & Spiess, Zürich 2012, . ([Kat. 627–1055, Kat. D53–D68 (fragliche Zuschreibungen), Kat. R71–R105 (irrtümliche und falsche Zuschreibungen).]
 Tobias G. Natter (Hg.): Hodler, Klimt und die Wiener Werkstätte, Scheidegger & Spiess, Zürich 2021, ISBN 978-3-03942-016-2

External links

 
 
 
 
 
Ferdinand Hodler exhibition at Kunstmuseum, Berna
 Images of his work on Wikiart.org
 Bibliographie sélective, revue et augmentée, des articles parus de 1875 à 1918 sur le peintre Ferdinand Hodler
 Documents publiés sur le peintre Ferdinand Hodler
 

1853 births
1918 deaths
19th-century Swiss painters
Swiss male painters
20th-century Swiss painters
Artists from Bern
Currency designers
19th-century Swiss male artists
20th-century Swiss male artists